Can't Get There from Here is the ninth studio album by the American hard rock band Great White, released in 1999. The track "Rollin' Stoned"  was released as a promo single and received airplay on mainstream rock radio.

Track listing 
 "Rollin' Stoned" (Michael Lardie, Jack Russell, Jack Blades) - 4:08
 "Ain't No Shame" (Lardie, Russell, Don Dokken, Blades) - 4:19
 "Silent Night" (Russell, Lardie, Blades) - 4:49
 "Saint Lorraine" (Russell, Lardie, Blades) - 4:04
 "In the Tradition" (Gary Burr, Blades) - 2:59
 "Freedom Song" (Mark Kendall, Russell, Lardie) - 4:36
 "Gone to the Dogs" (Russell, Kendall, Lardie, Dokken) - 2:42
 "Wooden Jesus" (Lardie, Russell, Dokken) - 4:23
 "Sister Mary" (Lardie, Alan Niven) - 4:54
 "Loveless Age" (Russell, Lardie, Blades) - 5:22
 "Psychedelic Hurricane" (Russell, Todd Griffin, Tim Henley) - 4:15
 "Hey Mister" (Russell, Lardie) - 5:07
 "The Good Die Young" (Jeff Pilson, Dokken) - 5:12 (bonus track on Japanese version)

Personnel

Band members 
 Jack Russell - lead and backing vocals, percussion
 Mark Kendall - guitar, percussion, backing vocals
 Michael Lardie - guitar, keyboards, percussion, backing vocals, engineer
 Sean McNabb - bass
 Audie Desbrow - drums

Production 
 Jack Blades – producer, backing vocals
 Don Dokken – producer on "Psychedelic Hurricane"
 Rob Easterday, Ken Koroshetz – assistant engineers
 Noel Golden – mixing
 David Donnelly – mastering
 Hooshik – art direction
 Paul McPhee – cover art concept, cover art
 Stephen Stickler – photography
 Jim Warren – cover art

Charts

Album

Singles
Rollin' Stoned

References 

1999 albums
Great White albums
Portrait Records albums